Fritz Grüssi (date of birth unknown) was a footballer who played for FC Basel as a defender.

Grüssi joined FC Basel's first team for their 1919–20 season under coach and captain Otto Kuhn. Grüssi played his domestic league debut for the club in the home game in the Landhof on 9 November 1919 as Basel won 3–2 against Luzern.

In his one season with the club Grüssi played a total of 12 games for Basel without scoring a goal. Eight of these games were in the domestic league and four were friendly games.

References

Sources
 Rotblau: Jahrbuch Saison 2017/2018. Publisher: FC Basel Marketing AG. 
 Die ersten 125 Jahre. Publisher: Josef Zindel im Friedrich Reinhardt Verlag, Basel. 
 Verein "Basler Fussballarchiv" Homepage

FC Basel players
Association football defenders
Swiss Super League players
Swiss men's footballers
Year of birth missing
Year of death missing